Hot Party Jamz is an EP that was sold  by Forever the Sickest Kids exclusively from Hot Topic around one month prior to their album release of Underdog Alma Mater. The EP contains two audio tracks and 4  video episodes containing footage from some of Forever the Sickest Kids' live shows and Warped Tour.

Track listing
"That for Me" – 2:59
"The Party Song" – 3:35

Video episodes
"Scooter Lew"
"Deep with Twin"
"Hey Bean"
"646-385-1423"

External links
Hot Party Jamz at Hot Topic

2008 EPs
Forever the Sickest Kids albums